Paratelmatobius mantiqueira is a species of frog in the family Leptodactylidae. It is endemic to Brazil where it is known from the Mantiqueira Mountains in the states of São Paulo and Rio de Janeiro. Its natural habitats are montane forests. It is probably threatened by habitat loss.

References

mantiqueira
Endemic fauna of Brazil
Amphibians of Brazil
Taxonomy articles created by Polbot
Amphibians described in 1999